The Ministry of School Education is a ministry of the Government of Maharashtra. It is responsible for designing and implementing education related policies in the state Maharashtra.

The Ministry is headed by a cabinet level minister Deepak Kesarkar

Head office

List of Cabinet Ministers

List of Ministers of State

Departments
Various departs come under ministry of education. 
Maharashtra Bureau of Textbook Production and Curriculum Research (MBTPCR) 
Maharashtra State Board of Secondary and Higher Secondary Education
Minority and adult education 
Maharashtra State Council of Education Research and Training (MSCERT)
Institute of Vocational Guidance 
State Science Institute, Nagpur 
State Education Technology Cell 
State Institute of English Study 
District Institute of Education & Training (DIET)
Maharashtra State Council of Examinations (MSCE)

References

External links

Government ministries of Maharashtra
Education in Maharashtra
Maharashtra